Rea (sometimes spelt Reah) is a name.  Notable people and characters with the name include:

Surname
Andrew Rea (born 1987), American culinary YouTube personality and filmmaker
Baron Rea, a peerage of the United Kingdom
Walter Russell Rea, 1st Baron Rea (1873–1948) 
Philip Russell Rea, 2nd Baron Rea (1900–1981) 
(John) Nicolas Rea, 3rd Baron Rea (1928–2020)
Carleton Rea (1861–1946), British mycologist
Chris Rea (born 1951), British singer-songwriter
Colin Rea (born 1990), American professional baseball pitcher
Flick Rea, English Liberal Democrat politician
George Rea (1894–1978), American banker and university president
Gino Rea (born 1989), British motorcycle racer
Herald Rea Cox (H. R. Cox) (1907–1986), American bacteriologist
Jackie Rea (1921–2013), Northern Irish snooker player
James F. Rea (b. 1937), American politician
James Rea Benson (1807–1885), Canadian businessman and politician from Ontario
Joseph "Joe" Rea (born 1958), Canadian curler and coach
John Rea (disambiguation), several people
Jonathan Rea (born 1987), Northern Irish motorcycle racer
Paul Rea (born 1968), American radio and television reporter from Georgia
Peggy Rea (1921–2011), American actress
Russell Rea (1846–1916), British ship-owner and politician
Samuel Rea (1855–1929), American railroad executive
Sean Rea (born 2002), Canadian soccer player
Silvia Dimitrova Rea (born 1970), Bulgarian painter 
Stephen Rea (born 1946), Irish actor
Steven Rea, American film critic 
Thomas Rea (1929–2016), American dermatologist
Tony Rea (born 1966), Australian rugby league coach
Virginia Rea, American singer
William Rea (ironmaster) (1662–1750?), partner or manager of English ironworks
 William Rea (real estate magnate) (1912–2006), of Pittsburgh, Pennsylvania

Given name

Rea 
Rea Brändle (born 1953), Swiss journalist
Rea Carey (born 1966), American human rights activist
Rea Garvey (born 1973), Irish singer
Rea Hraski (born 1992), Croatian sportswoman
Rea Irvin (1881–1972), American graphic artist
Rea Leakey (1915–1999), British officer
Rea Lenders (born 1980), Dutch trampoline gymnast
Rea Lest-Liik (born 1990), Estonian actress
Rea Mauranen (born 1949), Finnish television actress
Rea Mészáros (born 1994), Hungarian handball player
Rea Pittman (born 1993), Australian rugby league footballer
Rea Ann Silva (born 1961), American creator
Rea Tajiri (born 1958), Japanese–American filmmaker
Rea Wilmshurst (1941–1996), Canadian literary editor

Reah 
Reah Whitehead (1883-1972), one of the first female lawyers in Washington state

Single name

r e a (artist) (born 1962), Aboriginal Australian artist

Fictional characters
Princess Rea, in Friedrich Dürrenmatt's 1950 play Romulus der Große ("Romulus the Great")
 , in the Tenchi Muyo! series and only a character in the OVA continuity
 T'Rea, a Vulcan priestess on Star Trek, mother of Sybok
 Rhea Silvia (also written as Rea Silvia), and also known as Ilia), the mythical mother of the twins Romulus and Remus, said to have founded the city of Rome

English unisex given names
English-language surnames